An indirect presidential election took place in Estonia on August 29, 2011. There were two candidates: incumbent president Toomas Hendrik Ilves and European parliament deputy Indrek Tarand. For the first time in the country's post-Soviet history, only one round took place, as Ilves was able to secure the necessary two-thirds majority to get re-elected without a runoff. Ilves received 73 votes while Tarand obtained only 25. One vote was blank and two were disqualified. Ilves was supported by the ruling Estonian Reform Party and Union of Pro Patria and Res Publica, as well as the Social Democratic Party, to which he formerly belonged. Tarand was supported by the Estonian Centre Party.

References

Presidential elections in Estonia
Estonia
2011 in Estonia